The Zeegenbach is a stream in Franconia, Germany, in the Franconian Jura region, and is about  long.

Name 
In official maps, the Zeegenbach is sometimes also called the Ziegenbach. In other, non-official maps, the lower course of the stream is sometimes called the Strullendorfer Bach, or the "Strullendorf stream".

Course 
The Zeegenbach has its source east of the village Zeegendorf, in the karsts of the Franconian Switzerland. Through the "Zeegenbachtal" valley flows the stream of the same name in the direction of Strullendorf. Here a multitude of small sources feeds the stream. On its course lies the villages of Zeegendorf, Mistendorf, Leesten, Wernsdorf and Amlingstadt, all of which belong to the community of Strullendorf.

West from Strullendorf, the Zeegenbach crosses the Rhine–Main–Danube Canal. North of Pettstadt, the Zeegenbach flows into the Regnitz.

See also 
 List of rivers of Bavaria

References 

Rivers of Bavaria
Rivers of Germany